The 2015 188BET Champion of Champions was a professional non-ranking snooker tournament that took place between 10 and 15 November 2015 at the Ricoh Arena in Coventry, England. It was the third staging of the tournament since it was revived in 2013. In the United Kingdom, the tournament was broadcast on ITV4.

Ronnie O'Sullivan, who won the title in 2013 and 2014, chose not to defend his title in 2015.

Neil Robertson won the tournament, defeating Mark Allen 10–5 in the final.

Prize fund
The breakdown of prize money for 2015 is shown below:

 Winner: £100,000
 Runner-up: £50,000
 Losing Semi-finalist: £25,000
 Group runner-up: £10,000
 First round losers: £7,500
 Total: £300,000

Players
Players qualified for the event by winning important tournaments since the previous Champion of Champions. Entry was guaranteed for the defending champion, winners of rankings events and winners the following non-rankings events: 2015 Masters, 2015 Championship League, 2015 World Grand Prix, 2015 Players Championship Grand Final and 2015 World Cup. Remaining places were then allocated to winners of European Tour events (in the order they were played) and then, if required, to winners of Asian Tour events and then, winners of the 2015 Six-red World Championship, 2015 Snooker Shoot-Out and 2015 World Seniors Championship.

The following players qualified for the tournament:

Eight players were seeded. Seedings were determined in early October, before defending champion and top seed Ronnie O'Sullivan withdrew from the event. Other seeds were based on the latest world rankings (revision 3). Later in October, John Higgins was chosen as the final seed, being the highest ranked player who had then qualified and wasn't already seeded. He replaced O'Sullivan in the draw, taking the position allocated for the top seed. Mark Allen was ranked higher than Higgins in these rankings (revision 3) but hadn't qualified at that time.

Main draw

Final

Century breaks
Total: 14 
 144, 114, 109  Neil Robertson
 134, 107  Stephen Maguire
 131  Barry Hawkins
 128, 124  Ali Carter
 112, 105, 104, 103  Mark Allen
 112  Joe Perry
 104  Judd Trump

References

External links
 

2015
2015 in snooker
2015 in English sport
Sports competitions in Coventry
2010s in Coventry
November 2015 sports events in the United Kingdom